XEFE-AM (790 kHz) is a radio station in Nuevo Laredo, Tamaulipas, Mexico.

History

XEFE is among the oldest radio stations in Nuevo Laredo. It came to air in the 1920s, and by 1932 it was owned by Rafael Tijerina Carranza, who would found XEFE-TV in the same city. It originally broadcast on 1000 kHz.

On November 25, 1986, XEFE-AM-TV was sold to Ramona "Ramoncita" Esparza González. Esparza would sell the AM station in 2008 to Manuel Cristóbal Montiel Govea. Govea sold it in 2022 to Hera de Zeus, S.A. de C.V., which is owned by Guadalupe Biasi Serrano and Cecilia Faisal Martínez.

External links

References

Radio stations in Nuevo Laredo
Radio stations in Laredo, Texas
Regional Mexican radio stations